Zmeyevka is a rural locality (a khutor) in Starooskolsky District, Belgorod Oblast, Russia. The population was 94 as of 2010. There are 6 streets.

Geography 
Zmeyevka is located 47 km southeast of Stary Oskol (the district's administrative centre) by road. Glushkovka and Krutoye are the nearest rural localities.

References 

Rural localities in Starooskolsky District